Il bambino e il poliziotto is a 1989 Italian comedy film directed by Carlo Verdone.

Plot summary
The police officer Carlo Vinciguerra is investigating a drug trafficking cartel. In order to infiltrate it, he pretends to be the drug addicted nephew of acquaintance of Rosanna Clerici, and arrests her for possession during a party at her house. It appears however that the woman has a young child, with nobody else to care for him. Carlo ends up having to host the boy, until the judge will decide about his mother's request for house arrest.

Carlo's professional and personal life as a bachelor is turned upside down by the need to look after the boy. In particular, his clandestine relationship with an already married colleague from work is put under severe stress. Meanwhile Rosanna hates Carlo, whom she blames to have unjustly entrapped her. She accepts his tutelage of her son, only because of fear for retaliation by the criminal circle with which she was still in touch. Indeed the child ends up being kidnapped, but Carlo manages to find and free him.
After this, Rosanna decides to cooperate with the police, and she gets in return all charges dropped. Due to her child's requests, who has grown affectionate to Carlo, she also accepts to go on a date with him.

Cast
Carlo Verdone as Carlo Vinciguerra 
Federico Rizzo as Giulio 
Adriana Franceschi as Rosanna Clerici 
Barbara Cupisti as Lucia 
Luigi Petrucci as Chief Morra 
Gianluca Favilla as Inspector Folliero 
Isabella De Bernardi as Officer D'Ambrosio
Claudia Poggiani as Judge Caltabiano
Tony Brennero as Chief Cipriani
Salvatore Billa as Carmelo Privitera
Anna Maria Dossena as Adelina Cruciada
Francesco Gabriele as old gangster
Pietro Genuardi as Mauro, a kidnapper

References

External links

1989 films
Films directed by Carlo Verdone
1980s Italian-language films
1989 comedy films
Italian comedy films
1980s Italian films